Carl Blackbird (born 26 March 1965) is a former speedway rider from England and Great Britain.

Speedway career 
Blackbird reached the final of the British Speedway Championship in 1986. He rode in the top tier of British Speedway from 1981–1993, riding for various clubs. He was also the British Under 21 Champion.

Family
His son Lewis Blackbird is a former speedway rider, as were Carl's brothers Mark Blackbird and Paul Blackbird.

References 

1965 births
Living people
British speedway riders
Belle Vue Aces riders
Edinburgh Monarchs riders
Ipswich Witches riders
Long Eaton Invaders riders
Mildenhall Fen Tigers riders
Oxford Cheetahs riders
Reading Racers riders